Aquabacterium parvum is a Gram-negative, oxidase-positive, catalase-negative bacterium of the genus Aquabacterium in the family Comamonadaceae which was isolated with Aquabacterium commune and Aquabacterium citratiphilum from biofilms of Berlins drinking water.

References

External links
Type strain of Aquabacterium parvum at BacDive -  the Bacterial Diversity Metadatabase

Comamonadaceae
Bacteria described in 1999